Luca Botta (16 April 1882 – 29 September 1917) was an Italian operatic tenor.

Biography
He was born in Amalfi, Italy on 16 April 1882. He studied singing at the Naples Conservatory before making his operatic debut as Alfredo in La traviata in 1909. He made his Metropolitan Opera debut as Rodolfo in La bohème on November 21, 1914, and appeared in 91 performances with the company until his early death.

He died of cancer in New York City on 29 September 1917 at age 35. His funeral was planned to be held at the Church of the Blessed Sacrament but was moved to St. Patrick's Cathedral. He was buried in the Cemetery of Poggioreale, Naples and his pallbearers were: Pasquale Amato, Giuseppe de Luca, Leon Rothier, Antonio Scotti, Francesco Romei, Giulio Setti, Gennaro Papi, Fernando Carpi, Giulio Crimi, Francis Charles Coppicus, G. Viafora, and Dr. Henry Holbrook Curtis.

References

Further reading
Metropolitan Opera, Botta, Luca (Tenor), MetOpera Database performance record

Italian operatic tenors
1917 deaths
1882 births
People from Amalfi
Deaths from cancer in New York (state)
Italian emigrants to the United States
Burials at Woodlawn Cemetery (Bronx, New York)
20th-century Italian male opera singers